Cocked and Loaded is an LP released February 14, 2006 by the Revolting Cocks on 13th Planet Records.

Track listing

Promo and Europe

Retail

Personnel
All track numbers refer to the retail version.

Revolting Cocks
Alien Jourgensen - lead guitar (1, 5, 11), guitar (1, 4-11), bass (1, 3-7, 9-11), keyboards (1, 2, 5-7, 9-11), chorus guitar, chorus bass & percussion (2), background vocals (3-7, 9, 10), slide guitar (4, 6), vocals (4), drums (5, 6), drum programming (6, 7, 10), programming (8), fiddle (9), production, mixing
Gibby Haynes - vocals (1-3, 11), background vocals (1, 11)
Jello Biafra - vocals (6, 10)
Rick Nielsen - surf guitar (5), second slide guitar lead (6), guitar & "Tarzan" vocals (11)
Phildo Owen - scratching (2), vocals (4), background vocals (4, 6, 9, 10), cowbell (6), "rooster" & toy piano (9), "noises" (10)
Stevie Banch - chorus vocals (2), vocals (5, 7-9), background vocals (5, 7, 9), lead & rhythm guitar (7, 8), bass & drum programming (8)
Mark Baker - drums (1, 3, 4, 9, 11), background vocals (3, 4)

Additional Cocks
Billy Gibbons - lead guitar (4), first slide guitar lead (6)
Robin Zander - background vocals (7)
David Garza - baritone guitar (4)
Mike Scaccia - verse guitar & verse bass (2), guitar (3), wah guitar (4), "sample" guitar (10)
Darrel James - programming, background vocals

Revolting Pussies
Mackey Apple - background vocals (2, 11)
Aretha Jay - gospel vocals (2), background vocals
Lady Monster - background vocals, spoken word (11)
Marla Manning - background vocals
Vanessa Martinez - background vocals
Nadja Plagens - background vocals
Carolina Rhodes - background vocals
Maureen Miller - background vocals

Strap-on Cox
Marco A. Ramirez - background vocals, engineer
Chuy Flores - background vocals
Rene Garza - background vocals
Robert Manning - background vocals
Austin Rhodes - background vocals
Hector Saenz - background vocals
Bobby Torres - background vocals, assistant engineer
Gil Elguezabal - background vocals, assistant engineer
Ron Bissell - background vocals
Jesus Reyes - background vocals

Additional personnel
"Earth, Wind & Satan" - horns (2, 11)
"The Hell Paso Texass Symphony Orchestra" - backing vocals (11)
Justin Leeah - engineer
Dave Donnelly - mastering
Lawton Outlaw - artwork design & layout

Additional information
This is the band's first full-length release in 13 years; the last LP, Linger Ficken' Good, was issued in 1993. The LP's original working title was "Purple Head" and was originally due in 2004. "Caliente (Dark Entries)," a cover of sorts of "Dark Entries" by Bauhaus, with vocalist Gibby Haynes, was featured on the soundtrack to Saw II in 2005. A new track, "RevColution Medley", has displaced "Fire Engine" as the first track from the promo on the album, moving it to track 5.

Oddly enough, the same two members of Cheap Trick also appear on Cocked & Loaded by L.A. Guns.

The song "Revolting Cock au Lait" (appeared in the Retail Version of the album) is a mishmash of many songs considered hard rock classics. The intro uses the sampled "stomp-clap" from Queen's "We Will Rock You" and in the middle there is a simultaneous mashup parodying both the chorus from Pink Floyd's "Another Brick in the Wall" and Led Zeppelin's "Immigrant Song", alluding topics like masturbation ("We don't need some masturbation... aaaaah... Go fuck yourself! We don't need no cock control... aaaah... You fuck yourself!") and child sexual abuse by priests ("Preachers... Leave those kids alone!"). At one point a transposed version of the guitar solo from Led Zeppelin's "Stairway To Heaven" can be heard. Also, the melody used for this song (chords and compases) are based on Jimi Hendrix's "Purple Haze". "RevColution Medley" is a shorter version of "Revolting Cock au Lait", before the parody of this Pink Floyd song.

References

2006 albums
Revolting Cocks albums
Albums produced by Al Jourgensen
Albums recorded at Sonic Ranch